Lambertia multiflora, commonly known as many-flowered honeysuckle, is a multi-stemmed shrub which is endemic to the south-west of Western Australia. It grows to between 0.5 and 2.5 metres high and flowers from winter to summer.

There are two varieties:
Lambertia multiflora var. darlingiensis Hnatiuk - with yellow flowers
Lambertia multiflora var. mutiflora - with orange-red flowers

References

multiflora
Eudicots of Western Australia
Endemic flora of Southwest Australia